António Palolo (Évora, 1946 — Lisboa, 2000) was a Portuguese artist and painter.

Biography 

Palolo held his first one-person exhibition in 1964 at 111 Gallery, Lisbon, with great success. His early works were closely connected to the Pop idiom, mingling figurative and geometric elements.

In the 1970s, he changed into a rigorous type of abstraction where he came closer than ever to the minimalist program; simultaneously, he expanded his art practice into experimental film, performance and video.

In the 1980s, Palolo’s work briefly followed the international return to figurative expressionist painting; and in his final mode he synthesized the geometric structure of his 1970s painting with the subtlety of color and texture experienced in the eighties.

In 1995, Palolo held a large retrospective exhibition at the Modern Art Centre, Calouste Gulbenkian Foundation, Lisbon.

Bibliography

Barroso, Eduardo Pais – António Palolo. Lisboa: Editorial Caminho, 2007. 
A.A.V.V. – António Palolo 1963-1995. Lisboa: Centro de Arte Moderna,  Fundação Calouste Gulbenkian, 1995.
Pernes, Fernando – Panorama Arte Portuguesa no Século XX. Porto: Campo das Letras; Fundação de Serralves, 1999.

References

External links
Camões Institute 
 Berardo Museum, Lisbon 
Modern Art Centre, Calouste Gulbenkian Foundation, Lisbon 

1946 births
2000 deaths
People from Évora
20th-century Portuguese painters
20th-century male artists
Portuguese male painters